Henry Palliser (9 September 1793 – 17 December 1864) was an English first-class cricketer who is recorded in one match in 1822, totalling 13 runs with a highest score of 10 and holding one catch.

References

Bibliography
 

English cricketers
English cricketers of 1787 to 1825
Marylebone Cricket Club Second 9 with 3 Others cricketers
1790s births
1864 deaths